Mor Maman (born February 2, 1986) is an Israeli footballer who plays for Maccabi Kafr Kanna. Maman made his professional debut for Maccabi Haifa in a Toto Cup match against Hapoel Ramat Gan on September 16, 2003. He later played for Bnei Sakhnin, Hapoel Haifa, Hapoel Nazareth Illit, Maccabi Ironi Tirat HaCarmel, Maccabi Kafr Kanna and Hapoel Bnei Jadeidi. At international level, Maman was capped at levels from under-17 to under-19.

References

1986 births
Israeli Jews
Living people
Israeli footballers
Maccabi Haifa F.C. players
Hapoel Haifa F.C. players
Bnei Sakhnin F.C. players
Hapoel Nof HaGalil F.C. players
Maccabi Ironi Tirat HaCarmel F.C. players
Maccabi Kafr Kanna F.C. players
Israeli people of Moroccan-Jewish descent
Israeli Premier League players
Liga Leumit players
Association football defenders